Wallace "Mad Bear" Anderson (November 9, 1927 – December 10, 1985) was a Tuscarora Native American activist predominantly active in the 1950s who became a spokesman for Native American Sovereignty.

As a child, Anderson received the nickname "Mad Bear" from his grandmother due to his temper. As a young man, he enlisted in the U.S. Navy, serving during World War II in Okinawa, and later in Korea during the Korean War. Anderson became an activist for Native American Rights after being rejected for a loan under the GI Bill to build a house on the Tuscarora reservation.

Income Tax Protests
Anderson led protests against Iroquois payment of New York State income taxes in 1957. Several hundred Akwesasne Mohawks marched to the Massena, New York courthouse to burn court summons that were issued for unpaid taxes.

Tuscarora Reservoir Protest

The Power Authority of the State of New York seized Tuscarora Reservation land to build a reservoir to flood the land. Anderson was a key figure in the protest against the Tuscarora Reservoir, blocking surveyors from entering the reservation and deflating tires of workers, as well as lying in the road to block trucks. Despite the protest efforts, the U.S. Supreme Court eventually ruled that the taking of the land was legal and the reservoir was built.

Declaration of Sovereignty 
In March 1959, Anderson helped to lead a revolt and declaration of sovereignty at the Six Nations Reserve in Brantford, Ontario, the borough founded by Joseph Brant. Following this declaration, twelve Royal Canadian Mounted Police entered the reserve's council house, but the Iroquois forced them out.

References

External links
 Good Road Walking
 Anderson, Wallace Mad Bear
 Videorecording of interview with Anderson in 1959, British Pathe.

1927 births
1985 deaths
United States Navy personnel of World War II
United States Navy personnel of the Korean War
American tax resisters
Tuscarora people
Native American activists
Native American United States military personnel
Native Americans' rights activists
People from Lewiston, New York
United States Navy sailors
Activists from New York (state)